Brian John Copeland (born 1950) is Professor of Philosophy at the University of Canterbury, Christchurch, New Zealand, and author of books on the computing pioneer Alan Turing.

Education
Copeland was educated at the University of Oxford, obtaining a Bachelor of Philosophy degree and a Doctor of Philosophy degree in 1978, where he undertook research on modal logic and non-classical logic supervised by of Dana Scott.

Career and research
Jack Copeland is the Director of the Turing Archive for the History of Computing, an extensive online archive on the computing pioneer Alan Turing. He has also written and edited books on Turing.  He is one of the people responsible for identifying the concept of hypercomputation and machines more capable than Turing machines. With Jason Long he restored some of the first computer music recorded on the Ferranti Mark I.

Copeland has held visiting professorships at the University of Sydney, Australia (1997, 2002), the University of Aarhus, Denmark (1999), the University of Melbourne, Australia (2002, 2003), and the University of Portsmouth, United Kingdom (1997–2005). In 2000, he was a Senior Fellow in the Dibner Institute for the History of Science and Technology at the Massachusetts Institute of Technology, United States.

Copeland is also President of the US Society for Machines and Mentality and a member of the UK Bletchley Park Trust Heritage Advisory Panel. He is the founding editor of The Rutherford Journal, established in 2005.

Jack Copeland and Diane Proudfoot suggested the establishment of a Turing Center in Zurich during a guest stay at ETH Zurich in 2012. The idea was implemented and ETH Zurich was able to open the Turing Center Zurich in 2015. It is operational organizes regular conferences on questions related to computer, artificial intelligence and other.

The Rutherford Journal

Copeland serves as editor-in-chief of The Rutherford Journal, an open-access peer-reviewed online academic journal published in New Zealand that covers the history and philosophy of science and technology. The journal is published as needed and was established in December 2005 by Copeland. The full text of articles is freely available online in HTML format. The journal is named after the New Zealand physicist Ernest Rutherford (1871–1937), who studied at the Canterbury College (Christchurch).

The journal is indexed in various index lists. It was listed in an article on electronic journals in the Journal for the Association of History and Computing and included in the Isis Current Bibliography of the History of Science and Its Cultural Influences. The journal features technology as diverse as totalisators and the CSIRAC computer.

Publications
 Artificial Intelligence: A Philosophical Introduction (Blackwell, 1993, 2nd edition due) 
 Logic and Reality Essays on the Legacy of Arthur Prior (Oxford University Press, 1996) 
 The Essential Turing (Oxford University Press, 2004)  (pbk);  (hbk)
 Alan Turing’s Automatic Computing Engine: The Master Codebreaker's Struggle to Build the Modern Computer (Oxford University Press, 2005) 
 Colossus: The Secrets of Bletchley Park's Codebreaking Computers (Oxford University Press, 2006) 
 Alan Turing’s Electronic Brain: The Struggle to Build the ACE, the World’s Fastest Computer (Oxford University Press, 2012) 
 Computability: Turing, Gödel, Church, and Beyond (MIT Press, 2013).  (with Carl Posy and Oron Shagrir)
 Turing: Pioneer of the Information Age (Oxford University Press, 2014: Paperback edition) 
 The Turing Guide (Oxford University Press, 2017)  (hardcover),  (paperback) (with Jonathan Bowen, Robin Wilson, Mark Sprevak, et al.)

Awards and honours
Copeland was awarded Lecturer of the Year 2010 by the University of Canterbury's student union.

References

1950 births
20th-century English philosophers
20th-century essayists
20th-century English historians
21st-century English philosophers
21st-century essayists
21st-century English historians
Academic journal editors
Academics of the University of Portsmouth
Alumni of Corpus Christi College, Oxford
English logicians
English male non-fiction writers
British historians of mathematics
Historians of philosophy
Historians of science
Lecturers
Living people
New Zealand philosophers
New Zealand writers
Philosophers of logic
Philosophers of science
Philosophers of technology
Philosophy academics
Philosophy writers
Academic staff of the University of Canterbury